{
  "type": "FeatureCollection",
  "features": [
    {
      "type": "Feature",
      "properties": {},
      "geometry": {
        "type": "Point",
        "coordinates": [
          -74.10449981689455,
          42.26790919743789
        ]
      }
    }
  ]
}Blackhead is a mountain located in Greene County, New York. 
The mountain is part of the Blackhead range of the Catskill Mountains.
Blackhead is flanked to the northeast by Black Dome and Acra Point is located north.

Blackhead stands within the watershed of the Hudson River, which drains into New York Bay.
The southwest side of Blackhead drains into East Kill, thence into Schoharie Creek, the Mohawk River, and the Hudson River.
The north side of Blackhead drains into the headwaters of Batavia Kill, and thence into Schoharie Creek.
The east side of Blackhead drains into Trout Brook, thence into Shingle Kill, Catskill Creek, and the Hudson River.

Blackhead is within New York's Catskill Park.

See also 
 List of mountains in New York
 Catskill High Peaks
 Catskill Mountain 3500 Club

References

External links 
 
 

Mountains of Greene County, New York
Catskill High Peaks
Mountains of New York (state)